Shine is the fourth studio album by Swedish singer Anni-Frid Lyngstad, and her second international solo album as Frida. It was first released in September 1984 and has since been re-released several times, mainly in the digitally remastered form in 2005 with bonus tracks. Shine, alongside the accompanying promotional videos and clips, is included in Frida – 4xCD 1xDVD. This album has never been officially released in the United States, but was issued in Canada by WEA. This is Lyngstad's last solo English language studio album to date.

Recording history
After the success of Something's Going On, Phil Collins was to produce again for Frida's next album, but as Genesis formed part of his other commitments, producer Steve Lillywhite took over his role.

Recording began on 1 February 1984, at the Studios de la Grande Armée, Paris, France. The producer was Steve Lillywhite, and at only 29 years of age, he was already known for his work with Peter Gabriel, the Rolling Stones and U2 amongst others. Lilywhite's then-wife Kirsty MacColl co-wrote three songs that made the album, as well as a fourth recorded at the sessions and used as a B-side.

At the time of recording, both Something's Going On and Shine, Lyngstad wanted to distance herself from the "typical ABBA pop-sound" and try new directions. Lillywhite managed to give Lyngstad an even more modern and complex soundscape than Phil Collins had done on her previous album. In Frida – The DVD, when speaking about Shine and its failure to recreate the success of its predecessor, Lyngstad herself said "that maybe this album became a bit too modern for its time".

Music
Shine features songwriting contributions from musicians such as Stuart Adamson, Kirsty MacColl, Simon Climie (of Climie Fisher fame), and Pete Glenister, a frequent co-writer and producer of Alison Moyet's music. The Shine album is also unique as it saw the debut of Lyngstad as a songwriter in both "Don't Do It" and "That's Tough", the latter also features her son Hans Fredriksson as co-writer. (Frida also wrote "I Don't Wanna Be Alone" during this period). The track "Slowly" was written by Benny Andersson and Björn Ulvaeus of ABBA.

The lead single from the album was the title track, "Shine". In some countries "Twist in the Dark", "Come to Me (I Am Woman)" and "Heart of the Country" were released as singles. Shine reached the Top 10 on the album charts in Sweden and Norway, and the Top 30 in the Netherlands and Switzerland.

Track listing
Side 1
 "Shine" (Kevin Jarvis, Guy Fletcher, Jeremy Bird) – 4:39
 "One Little Lie" (Simon Climie, Kirsty MacColl) – 3:44
 "The Face" (Daniel Balavoine, Kirsty MacColl) – 3:40
 "Twist in the Dark" (Andee Leek) – 3:43
 "Slowly" (Björn Ulvaeus, Benny Andersson) – 4:34

Side 2
 "Heart of the Country" (Stuart Adamson) – 4:38
 "Come to Me (I Am Woman)" (Eddie Howell, David Dundas) – 5:04
 "Chemistry Tonight" (Pete Glenister, Simon Climie, Kirsty MacColl) – 4:56
 "Don't Do It" (Anni-Frid Lyngstad) – 4:37
 "Comfort Me" (Pete Glenister) – 4:28

2005 remaster bonus tracks
<li>"That's Tough" (Anni-Frid Lyngstad, Hans Fredriksson, Kirsty MacColl) – 5:03
<li>"Shine" (Extended Mix) (Kevin Jarvis, Guy Fletcher, Jeremy Bird) – 6:31

Personnel 
 Anni-Frid Lyngstad – lead vocals, backing vocals
 Simon Climie – keyboards, synthesizers, harpsichord, backing vocals
 Pete Glenister – electric guitars, acoustic guitars
 Rutger Gunnarsson – bass (1, 8)
 Tony Levin – bass (2-7, 9, 10)
 Mark Brzezicki – drums
 Marc Chantreau – percussion
 Kirsty MacColl – backing vocals

Production 
 Stikkan Andersson – executive producer
 Steve Lillywhite – producer
 Howard Gray – sound engineer
 Frédéric Delafaye – assistant engineer
 David Edwards – studio coordinator
 Thomas Johansson – album coordinator
 Görel Hanser – album coordinator
 Heinz Angermayr – cover photos
 Cay Bond – styling
 Digitally recorded and mixed at Studios de la Grande Armée, Paris France
 Remastered in 2005 by Henrik Jonsson of Masters of Audio, Stockholm

Charts

References

1984 albums
Anni-Frid Lyngstad albums
Albums produced by Steve Lillywhite